is a former Japanese football player.

Playing career
Ito was born in Shizuoka Prefecture on April 7, 1974. After graduating from high school, he joined his local club Shimizu S-Pulse in 1993. He debuted in 1994 and played often as left midfielder from 1995 onward. In 1998, he moved to the Japan Football League club Kawasaki Frontale. The club was promoted to the J2 League in 1999 and won the championship in 1999. However he did not play as often. In 2000, he moved to the J2 club Consadole Sapporo on loan. He played as a regular left midfielder and the club won the championship and was promoted to the J1 League. However his opportunity to play decreased after injury in 2001. In 2002, he returned to Kawasaki Frontale. He did not play much and retired at the end of the 2004 season.

Club statistics

References

External links

Kawasaki Frontale

1974 births
Living people
Association football people from Shizuoka Prefecture
Japanese footballers
J1 League players
J2 League players
Japan Football League (1992–1998) players
Shimizu S-Pulse players
Kawasaki Frontale players
Hokkaido Consadole Sapporo players
Association football midfielders